Livada Solar Park is a large thin-film photovoltaic (PV) power system, built on a  plot of land located between Livada and Drăguşeni in Romania. The solar park has around 230,000 state-of-the-art thin film PV panels for a total nameplate capacity of 56-megawatts, and was finished in November 2013. The solar park is expected to supply around 33.6 GWh of electricity per year enough to power some 60,000 average homes.

The installation is located in the Satu Mare County in north-western Romania between the city of Livada and the village of Drăguşeni. The investment cost for the Livada solar park amounts to some Euro 65 million.

See also

Energy policy of the European Union
Photovoltaics
Renewable energy commercialization
Renewable energy in the European Union
Solar power in Romania

References

Photovoltaic power stations in Romania